The Marionettes is a 1918 American silent comedy film directed by Émile Chautard and starring Clara Kimball Young, Nigel Barrie, and Alec B. Francis.

Cast

References

Bibliography
 Donald W. McCaffrey & Christopher P. Jacobs. Guide to the Silent Years of American Cinema. Greenwood Publishing, 1999.

External links

1918 films
1918 comedy films
Silent American comedy films
Films directed by Emile Chautard
American silent feature films
1910s English-language films
American black-and-white films
Selznick Pictures films
1910s American films